"Devil Gate Drive" is a song by American singer Suzi Quatro. It was Quatro's second (and final) solo number one single in the UK, spending two weeks at the top of the chart in February 1974. According to ukcharts.20m.com, she only reached number one again, in the UK, 13 years and 26 days later (as part of the Ferry Aid band in a charity version of the Lennon–McCartney song "Let It Be").

Written and produced by Nicky Chinn and Mike Chapman, "Devil Gate Drive" was the second number one in a row for the "ChinniChap" writing and production team, following the success of "Tiger Feet" by Mud. The single was re-recorded for Quatro's 1995 album What Goes Around as the opening track. The track was the B-side to the re-release in 1987, when "Can the Can" became a minor hit.

A vocal extract was used on Orbital's "Bigpipe Style". The song was featured on the show Happy Days, during season 5, on the episode "Fonzie and Leather Tuscadero, Part II". Quatro played Leather Tuscadero on the show.

Chart performance

Weekly charts

Year-end charts

See also
List of number-one singles in Australia during the 1970s
List of number-one singles of 1974 (Ireland)
List of number-one songs in Norway
List of UK Singles Chart number ones of the 1970s

References

1974 songs
1974 singles
Irish Singles Chart number-one singles
Number-one singles in Australia
Number-one singles in Norway
RAK Records singles
Song recordings produced by Mike Chapman
Songs written by Mike Chapman
Songs written by Nicky Chinn
Suzi Quatro songs
UK Singles Chart number-one singles